Edmark Corporation (or simply Edmark) was a publisher of educational print materials and an educational software developer in Redmond, Washington. They developed software for Microsoft Windows and MacOS in several languages and sold it in over a dozen countries.

History
Edmark was founded in 1970 by Gordon B.Bleil by combining the assets of Educational Aids and Services Co. a small supplier of educational materials and programs and L-Tec Systems Inc. which had developed programs from its research. The Child Development and Mental Retardation Center of the University of Washington under the direction of Dr. Sidney Bijou had conducted research into the operant conditioning and reinforcement theories of B.F. Skinner as applicable to human learning. From this research they developed academic programs which for the first time proved the viability of teaching reading to people with severe mental limitations. Bleil adapted this research into The Edmark Reading Program which for the next decade was the principal product of the company.

Bleil left the company to return to banking in 1980 and retained no interest in the company.

They began developing software in 1992. Edmark was listed on NASDAQ. Their audience was children between the ages of 2 and 16 years. Edmark had more than 65 industry design awards.

In 1989, their children, Richard, Lucy, Heather and Chris became directors. Richard became the chairman, Heather became the CCO, Chris became the president and Lucy became the CEO in October 1989. Edmark hired former teacher Donna Stanger as vice-president of product development in October 1991.

In 1992, Edmark released Millie's Math House and KidDesk. Sally Narodick resigned as CEO in September citing the stress, and Donna Stanger became the CEO

Edmark was acquired by IBM on November 13, 1996 for $102.3 million ($15.50 per share for two-thirds of Edmark's shares) to expand its presence in home software.

In September 2000, it was sold to Riverdeep Interactive Learning for about $85 million.

As of 2017, Houghton Mifflin Harcourt offered the Edmark, Edmark House Series, Mighty Math, and Thinkin' Things brands as licensing opportunities on its website. HMH sold the rights to many of Edmark's products to Rise Global in 2021.

Software
KidDesk (1992)
Strategy Challenges Collection 1 (formerly Strategy Games of the World) (1995) Release date: November 1995
Strategy Challenges Collection 2: In the Wild (1997) 
ThemeWeavers: Animals
ThemeWeavers: Nature
Travel the World with Timmy! Deluxe
Let’s Go Read! 1: An Island Adventure - ages 4–6
Let’s Go Read! 2: An Ocean Adventure - ages 7–12
Stories & More: Animal Friends
Stories & More: Time and Place
MindTwister Math
Space Academy GX-1
Virtual Labs: Light
Virtual Labs: Electricity
Talking Walls ― runner-up for the Macworld 16th Annual Editors' Choice Award for Education
Talking Walls: The Stories Continue

Early Learning House
Millie's Math House (1992) ― ages 2–6 Release date: June 19, 1992
Bailey's Book House (1993) ― ages 2–6 Release date: March 26, 1993
Sammy's Science House (1994) ― ages 3–7 Release date: May 22, 1994
Trudy's Time & Place House (1995) ― ages 3–7 Release date: August 6, 1995
Stanley’s Sticker Stories (1996) Release date: April 21, 1996

Thinkin' Things
Thinkin' Things Collection 1 (Formerly Thinkin Things) (1993) ― ages 4–8 Release date: September 1993
Thinkin' Things Collection 2 (1994) ― ages 6–12 Release date: October 1994
Thinkin' Things Collection 3 (1995) ― ages 7–13 Release date: October 1995
Thinkin' Things: Toony the Loon’s Lagoon (remastered version of Thinkin Things Collection 1)
Thinkin' Things: All Around FrippleTown ― ages 4–8, won the 1999 Macworld Editors' Choice Award for Education
Thinkin' Things Sky Island Mysteries ― ages 8–12
Thinkin' Science
Thinkin' Science Series: ZAP! (1998)
Thinkin' Space

Imagination Express
Imagination Express: Neighborhood Release date: October 1994
Imagination Express: Castle Release date: November 1994
Imagination Express: Rain Forest Release date: May 1995
Imagination Express: Ocean Release date: October 1995
Imagination Express: Pyramids
Imagination Express: Time Trip, USA

Mighty Math
Mighty Math Carnival Countdown (1996) ― ages 4–8 Release date: July 1996
Mighty Math Number Heroes (1996) ― ages 7–12 Release date: July 1996
Mighty Math Zoo Zillions
Mighty Math Calculating Crew
Mighty Math Astro Algebra
Mighty Math Cosmic Geometry

Reception
Computer Gaming World in 1993 stated that "Bailey's Book House combines the best of educational theory with a loving attention to detail and an engaging presentation ... a real winner".

References

External links
 Educated Ideas
 COMPANY NEWS;EDMARK STOCK IS HURT BY OUTLOOK ON EARNINGS
 Edmark Corp. reports earnings for Qtr to Dec 31
 Behind the Fading of a Onetime Software Star
 I.B.M. In $110 Million Deal For Ailing Software Seller
 LIBRARY/THINKING SKILLS; Thinkin' Things Collection 3
 SOFTWARE; Home Lessons For Children Ready to Read

Houghton Mifflin Harcourt
Software companies established in 1970
Software companies disestablished in 2017
Riverdeep subsidiaries
Companies based in Redmond, Washington
Educational software companies
Publishing companies established in 1970
Publishing companies disestablished in 2017
Mattel
1970 establishments in Washington (state)
2017 disestablishments in Washington (state)
2000 mergers and acquisitions